Family with sequence similarity 122C is a protein that in humans is encoded by the FAM122C gene.

References

Further reading